A degloving injury is a type of avulsion in which an extensive section of skin is completely torn off the underlying tissue, severing its blood supply. It is named by analogy to the process of removing a glove.

The causes of degloving can vary, but they often occur when someone's hand or arm gets stuck in a machine or when they're involved in a car accident. Treatment for degloving injuries can vary depending on the severity of the injury, but often includes surgery and skin grafts.

All sorts of things can lead to this type of injury. Car accidents, falls, or getting caught in machinery are all common causes. But there are also less obvious things that can cause degloving injuries, like contact with chemicals or extreme weather conditions.

Effects
Typically, degloving injuries affect the extremities and limbs; in these cases, they are frequently associated with underlying fractures. Any injury which would induce degloving of the head or torso is likely to be lethal. However, controlled facial degloving is often featured in plastic surgery.

Degloving injuries invariably require major surgical interventions. Treatment options include replantation or revascularization of the degloved skins, or when these are not possible, skin grafts or skin flaps. While the preservation of the extremities and limbs is normally preferred, in some cases amputations may be advised or required. Post-operative physiotherapy is of particular importance for degloving injuries involving the hand.

Other animals
Many small mammals are able to induce degloving of their tails to escape capture; this is comparable to tail autotomy in reptiles.

References

External links
Report on degloving injuries in children

Injuries
Skin